Anthony Stuart "Tony" Blunn  (born 1936) is a retired Australian senior public servant.

Life and career
Tony Blunn was born in 1936.

He joined the Australian Public Service at the age of 21, after four years with a firm of solicitors in Melbourne.

In 1979 Blunn took a position in the Department of Finance, in an area linked with works, mainland Territories, defence and other areas. He moved to the Department of Business and Consumer Affairs in 1980, and was appointed to his first permanent Secretary role in 1981 as head of the Department of the Capital Territory.

Blunn was appointed Secretary of the Attorney General's Department in 1998, replacing Stephen Skehill who resigned from the role.

Blunn retired from the public service in December 1999.

In 2000 Blunn was appointed chairman of the company in charge of managing Bruce Stadium.

Awards and honours
In January 1989 Blunn was made an Officer of the Order of Australia in recognition of service to the public service.

Blunn Island, in Antarctica, is named after Blunn, who was responsible for Australia's Antarctic program between 1987 and 1993.

References

1936 births
Living people
Australian public servants
Officers of the Order of Australia